Turkovići may refer to:

 Turkovići (Fojnica), a village in Bosnia and Herzegovina
 Turkovići (Pale), a village in Bosnia and Herzegovina
 Turkovići (Sokolac), a village in Bosnia and Herzegovina

See also
 Turkovići Ogulinski, a village in Croatia